Richard Addai (born 17 April 1991) is a Ghanaian footballer who plays as a forward for Ghana Premier League side Cape Coast Ebusua Dwarfs.

Career 
Addai played for Dunkwa United in 2015–2016. He scored 14 goals for the club in the Ghana Division One League that season. His goal tally in the second-tier league attracted interest from teams in the Ghana Premier League and in November 2016, he joined GPL side Dreams, signing a three-year contract with the club. On 1 April 2018, by coming on in the 80th minute for Eric Gawu in a 1–0 away defeat to Accra Hearts of Oak. He scored his debut goal on 12 May 2019 during a 2019 GFA Normalization Committee Special Competition match against International Allies. He scored a lone goal through an assist from Michael Agbepkonu to secure a victory for Dreams, helping them to end their eight-match unbeaten run. In August 2019, he left the club after his three-year deal expired.

In March 2021, he joined Cape Coast Ebusua Dwarfs during the second transfer period of the 2020–21 season. He made his debut for the club on 29 February 2021 playing the full 90 minutes in a 2–1 loss to Berekum Chelsea. His debut goal came 30 May 2021 in a match against West African Football Academy (WAFA), scoring the equalizer in the 82nd minute after Enock Asubonteng had put WAFA ahead. The match ended in a 2–1 loss to Ebusua Dwarfs after Emmanuel Anaful had scored an own goal in the 89th minute.

References

External links 

Living people
1991 births
Association football forwards
Ghanaian footballers
Dreams F.C. (Ghana) players
Ghana Premier League players